Thomas Ambrosio (born May 31, 1971) is a professor of political science in the Criminal Justice and Political Science Department at North Dakota State University. He teaches courses in international relations and international law.

Career
Ambrosio received his B.A. from Trenton State College (now, the College of New Jersey) and his PhD in foreign affairs in 2000 from the University of Virginia.

Ambrosio taught at Western Kentucky University from 1999 to 2000 and has since then taught at North Dakota State University, where he is a professor with tenure.  He is currently the Department Head of Criminal Justice and Political Science.

In 2007, Ambrosio was awarded the NDSU College of Arts, Humanities, and Social Sciences 'Outstanding Research' award as well as the 'Distinguished Educator's Award' from the NDSU chapter of the Blue Key National Honor Society. Ambrosio was director of NDSU's International Studies Major from 2009 to 2014. In 2011, he was awarded the NDSU College of Arts, Humanities, and Social Sciences 'Outstanding Educator' award.  In 2017 he received the NDSU College of Arts, Humanities, and Social Sciences 'Outstanding Service' award.

On 18 April 2018, Ambrosio delivered the NDSU Faculty Lectureship, one of the oldest and most prestigious of the University's awards, which recognizes sustained professional excellence in teaching, scholarly achievement, and service among current faculty at NDSU. The Faculty Lectureship is conferred on an individual who has demonstrated excellence in all three areas. His presentation, "A New, New World Order:  America's Challenges in a Post-American International System," can be viewed.

Publications
Ambrosio has published extensively on the relationship between ethnic groups and nation states, examining such topics as: attempts by states to annex the territory of other states where their co-nationals reside (Irredentism); the status of nations in international law; the role played by organized ethnic interest groups in the formulation of governmental foreign policy; the role that political opportunity structures limit nationalist expression; and, how Russia's conception of itself affects its relationship with the United States and its perceived role in the unipolar international system.

Ambrosio's most recent articles have examined Russia-China relations, authoritarian learning, American perceptions of the Russian threat, Russia’s perception management campaign over its annexation of Crimea, Russian treaties with South Ossetia and Abkhazia, and President Obama’s geopolitical code.  He is currently working on projects on hereditary succession  in the former Soviet Union and U.S. threat perceptions of Russia and China.

Ambrosio's most recently completed a book project was entitled Authoritarian Backlash:  Russian Resistance to Democratization in the Former Soviet Union and examines five strategies that an increasingly authoritarian Russia has adopted to preserve the Kremlin's political power: insulate, bolster, subvert, redefine and coordinate.  Each strategy seeks to counter or undermine regional democratic trends both at home and throughout the former Soviet Union. Policies such as these are of great concern to the growing literature on how autocratic regimes are becoming more active in their resistance to democracy.  Through detailed case studies of each strategy, this book makes significant contributions to our understandings of Russian domestic and foreign policies, democratization theory, and the policy challenges associated with democracy promotion.

Ambrosio's curriculum vitae lists his publications.

Books
 Russian Resistance to Democratization in the Former Soviet Union. 2009. 
 Challenging America's Global Preeminence: Russia's Quest for Multipolarity. 2005. 
 Ethnic Identity Groups and U.S. Foreign Policy. (as editor and contributor) 2002. 
 International Law and the Rise of Nations. (as co-editor, with Robert J. Beck, and contributor) 2001. 
 Irredentism: Ethnic Conflict and International Politics. 2000.

References

1971 births
Living people
American political scientists
American international relations scholars
North Dakota State University faculty
University of Virginia alumni